SS Oslo was a British passenger ship that was torpedoed by the German submarine  in the North Sea 15 nautical miles (28 km) east by north of the Out Skerries, Shetland Islands. She was travelling from Trondheim, Norway to Liverpool, United Kingdom while carrying passengers and a cargo of copper ore.

Construction and maiden voyage 
SS Oslo was constructed in 1906 with yard no. 515 at the  Earle's Shipbuilding & Engineering Co. shipyard in Hull, United Kingdom. She was launched on 9 April 1906 and finally completed on 19 May 1906. She departed on her maiden voyage on the Kristiania (Oslo) - Kristiansand - Hull service on 25 May 1906.

Ship characteristics  
She had one funnel, two masts, steel construction and a single screw, 2 decks, water ballast, and was fitted with electric light.

On sea trials on 12 May 1906, she achieved a speed of 13½ miles (13 knots).  
Respectively; stroke . The engine was rated at 233 nhp, it was built by the same company as the hull.

There was accommodation for 95 1st class, 32 2nd class and 90 3rd class passengers in permanent accommodation, with provision for about 410 other steerage in temporary berths.

Routes 
The ship was built specially for the Christiania route. But from 1911 onward SS Oslo was also engaged on other Norwegian routes, and was seen several times on the Trondheim - Hull service. The last departure that SS Oslo made from Christiania was on 20 March 1915.

Earlier Incident and sinking 
SS Oslo survived one attack in October 1915 by outrunning her assailant and making it safely to her destination.

On 21 August 1917, Oslo was en route from Trondheim, Norway to Liverpool, United Kingdom while carrying passengers and a cargo of copper ore.

References

1906 ships
Ships built in Kingston upon Hull
Steamships of the United Kingdom
World War I passenger ships of the United Kingdom
Maritime incidents in 1917
Ships sunk by German submarines in World War I
1917 in Norway
World War I shipwrecks in the North Sea